Thomas Rex Davidson (30 July 1927 – 11 January 2017) was a Tasmanian cricketer. He played first class cricket for Tasmania twelve times between the 1949–50 season and the 1955–56 season. He and Bertie Brownlow alternated in that period as the side's wicket-keeper. Brownlow was preferred for his skills behind the stumps, whereas Davidson proved to be the better batsman of the two, contributing to the lower order with scores of over 50 on four occasions. Davidson filled in as captain of the side for two games in the 1952–53 season, due to the absence through injury of then permanent captain Emerson Rodwell, but Tasmania lost both games under his captaincy.

References

External links

1927 births
2017 deaths
Australian cricketers
Tasmania cricketers
Cricketers from Victoria (Australia)